Raška is a town and municipality located in the Raška District of southwestern Serbia. The municipality has a population of 24,680 people, while the town has a population of 6,574 people (2011 census). It covers an area of 670 km2 (259 sq. mi.). The town is situated on the rivers Raška and Ibar.

History
The town and municipality bears the name of the historical Raška region. From 1929 to 1941, Raška was part of the Zeta Banovina of the Kingdom of Yugoslavia.

Demographics

According to the 2011 census results, the municipality of Raška has 24,678 inhabitants.

Ethnic groups
The ethnic composition of the municipality:

Economy
The following table gives a preview of total number of registered people employed in legal entities per their core activity (as of 2018):

Gallery

Notable people
 Branko Jovicic, Serbian and Red Star football player
 Savatije Milošević, Serbian hajduk and Chetnik commander, born in Pavlica
 Serbian Patriarch German
 Goran Bogdanović, Serbian politician
 Milenković family (Svetozar Milenković (1907-1983), Vida Milenković (1912-1992), and Aleksandar Petrović), Righteous Among the Nations
 Zoran Pešić, Serbian footballer
 Mihailo Petrović (1871-1941), Chetnik
 Lazar Popović, Serbian footballer
 Marko Sočanac, Serbian football player
 Milunka Savić, Serbian WWI hero

See also
Varevo

References

External links

 
 Tourism Organization of Raška

 
Municipalities and cities of Šumadija and Western Serbia